Fabriogenia canberra is a species of spider wasp within the genus Fabriogenia, and was described by Howard Ensign Evans based on a holotype from Canberra, Australia.

Description
Length is up to 9 mm with legs and body being black. Antennae are bright orange except on the scape and a weak darkening on the apical segment. Body colour, wings and hair are the same as Fabriogenia dilga but the difference is in Fabriogenia canberra having a longer antennae and longer postnotum. Differences also exist in the shape of the clypeus and wing venation details

References 

Insects of Australia
Insects described in 1972
Pompilidae